Prof George Gregory Smith (20 June 1865 – 3 March 1932) was a Scottish literary critic.

He corresponded with Mark Twain, and also lived in Florence for a while.

He died in London but is buried with his wife Mary east of the western path in Dean Cemetery in Edinburgh.

Family

He was married to Mary Cadell (1866-1909) daughter of Col Robert Cadell.

Selected works
The Days of James IV (1890)
The Transition Period (1900)
Specimens of Middle Scots (1902)
 Elizabethan Critical Essays, vol. I & vol. II (1904, editor)
 Scottish Literature: Character & Influence (1919).

References

 
Author and Bookinfo.com

External links
 

Scottish literary critics
1865 births
1932 deaths